Cornelius Randall Robinson (July 31, 1907 – July 23, 1983) was a professional baseball player in the Negro leagues. Robinson was also known by his nicknames Neil, Neal, and Shadow. He primarily played centerfield, but also played short stop, left field, and third base. He played from 1930 to 1952, mostly for the Memphis Red Sox. He also played with the Homestead Grays and Cincinnati Tigers. He was best known as a power hitter. Robinson had several seasons with a batting average greater than .300, and in 1939 and 1940, he won back-to-back Negro American League home run titles.

Early life
Robinson was born in Birmingham, Alabama on July 3, 1907. His parents were Cornell Robinson and Flora Fitzpatrick. At a young age his family moved from Opelika, Alabama to Gray, Indiana. Prior to 1929, Robinson moved to Grand Rapids, Michigan and married Mattie Robertson. The 1930 Census listed him as having no formal schooling, but indicate that he was able to read. He was a bus boy and a janitor in the early 1930s during his semi-pro career in Grand Rapids.

Baseball

Semi-Pro
Robinson and his brother John played for the Illinois Giants in the spring of 1928. The Giants, based out of the Chicago area, were a barnstorming team that traveled through Illinois, Indiana, and Michigan. By June of that year the brothers were playing for the Fox Jewelry Colored Giants based out of Grand Rapids. Robinson would play for the Fox Giants through 1929. In 1930 the brothers moved south and both signed with the Lexington Hard Hitters. Robinson would also play several games for the Lockland Valley Tigers that year, but for the majority of the season he was a member of the Hard Hitters. In 1931 Neil played for both the Gary, Indiana Steel City Giants and the Gray Grasselli Giants. He returned to Grand Rapids playing for the Fineis Oils Giants in 1932 and the Pere Marquette Giants in 1933.

During his time in Grand Rapids and Lexington, Robinson was known for both his hitting and fielding. Robinson was selected as part of a Grand Rapid All-Star team on three occasions to play major league teams. He took part in exhibition games against the Philadelphia Athletics, Detroit Tigers, and St. Louis Cardinals. In twelve at bats, he had five hits.

Homestead Grays
In 1934, Robinson was hired by Cumberland Posey to play for the Homestead Grays. He replaced outfielder Vic Harris who was now a member of the Pittsburgh Crawfords. Robinson's batting average at the end of the 1934 season was .241. 1934 was his only season with the Grays. A drinking problem, that would plaque Robinson through out his career, led to his dismissal from the team.

Cincinnati Tigers
Robinson played with the Cincinnati Tigers from 1935 to 1937. In 1935 and 1936 the Tigers were a member of the Indiana-Ohio League and associate with both the Negro National League and the Negro Southern League. In 1937 the Tigers joined the newly formed Negro American League. Robinson would develop into a power hitter while playing in Cincinnati. In 1936 he batted .419 and in 1937 his average was .301. In 1936 Robinson reportedly hit the longest home run in the Sherwood Oval. The ball “hit the 472-foot sign on about three bounces.” He finished the 1936 season with 34 home runs against all levels of competition.

Memphis Red Sox
At the end of the 1937 season, despite their success on the field, the Cincinnati Tigers disbanded. The Memphis Red Sox, also founding members of the Negro American League, acquired Robinson and several other players from the Tigers as the 1938 season started. Robinson remained with the Red Sox for fifteen years until his retirement in 1952. During that time he was the team's top player and biggest attraction. From 1938 to 1948 he was Memphis’ leading hitter with 167 RBIs and a batting average of .299. Over the 38 year history of the Memphis Red Sox, Robinson was the greatest hitter the team would ever have on its rooster.

The new talent that Memphis acquired from the former Tigers, including Robinson, had an immediate effect on the team. The Red Sox were in first place at the end of the first half of the 1938 season which earned them a spot in league championship series against the Atlanta Black Crackers. In the abbreviated two game series Robinson lead the Red Sox offense by going four for four with a walk, two home runs, five RBIs.

Robinson played in his first East-West game in 1938. His inside the park homerun scored three runs and led the West to a 5–4 victory over the East.

In 1939 Robinson continued to hit the baseball out of park for the Red Sox. This led the Memphis Commercial Appeal newspaper to dub him the “negro home run artist.” Neil hit twenty-five home runs against league teams in both barnstorming games and official league games. He hit fifty-four home runs against all levels of competition. His batting average though dropped to .275, but another home run at the East West All Star game helped lead the West to victory.

Between 1940 and 1948, Robinson batted greater than .300 over a season four more times. In 1943, Robinson's boyhood home of Gray, Indiana held a “Neil Robinson Day.” The game was between the East Chicago Giants and the Chicago Brown Bombers at E. J. Block Stadium in East Chicago. Robinson played center field for the East Chicago Giants who won 6–1. The following year “Neil Robinson Day” was celebrated at Wrigley Field. The Memphis Red Sox played a double header against the Kansas City Monarchs. Robinson marked the occasion by hitting a home run off of the Monarchs pitcher Satchel Paige. The Red Sox won both games. Earlier that year, on the south side of Chicago, Robinson hit a Grand Slam at Comiskey Stadium against the Chicago American Giants.

At the end of the 1948 Negro American League season, Robinson played with Kansas City Royals. The Royals were a collection of the Negro League All-Stars including Satchel Paige, who was now a member of the Cleveland Indians. The Royals played a team of Major League All-Stars headed by Cleveland Indians pitcher Bob Lemon. The Kansas City Royals won three of the six games they played against Lemon's All-Stars. Robinson had three hits in nine at bats and a total of four RBIs.

In 1951, the last full year that Robinson played baseball, Howe News Bureau listed his batting average as .416 in the early part of June. Robinson was again voted to attend the East West All-Star game, but due to injuries he was unable to play. Robinson finished the year batting hitting .344. During the postseason he played as part of a Negro League All-Star team against Roy Campanella's Major League All-Stars.

Basketball
Robinson played semipro basketball in both the winter of 1930 and 1931 for Gilkerson’s Union Giants. He played as one of the teams Forwards and was called “Shadow” by his teammates, a nickname that was given to him due to his quickness on the court. The team also included Olympian, Sol Butler, and Globe Trotter founder, Tommy Brookins.

Later life and death
Robinson lived in Cincinnati until his death on July 23, 1983.

References

External links
 and Baseball-Reference Black Baseball stats and Seamheads
Negro League Baseball Museum

Cincinnati Tigers (baseball) players
Homestead Grays players
Louisville White Sox players
Little Rock Grays players
Memphis Red Sox players
1907 births
1983 deaths
Baseball players from Alabama
20th-century African-American sportspeople